Tomáš Harant (born April 28, 1980) is a Slovak professional ice hockey player. He is currently a free agent having last played for MsHK Zilina in the Slovak Extraliga. Harant was drafted in the sixth-round of the 2000 NHL Entry Draft, 173rd overall by the Nashville Predators.

Harant made his Czech Extraliga debut playing with HC Oceláři Třinec during the 2000-01 Czech Extraliga season.

Career statistics

Regular season and playoffs

International

References

External links

1980 births
Living people
HC Oceláři Třinec players
MsHK Žilina players
AZ Havířov players
HC Dynamo Moscow players
HC Karlovy Vary players
Motor České Budějovice players
Lowell Devils players
Mora IK players
HC Bílí Tygři Liberec players
Stadion Hradec Králové players
Piráti Chomutov players
Czech ice hockey defencemen
Sportspeople from Žilina
Nashville Predators draft picks
Slovak expatriate ice hockey players in the United States
Slovak expatriate ice hockey players in the Czech Republic
Slovak expatriate ice hockey players in Russia
Slovak expatriate ice hockey players in Sweden